The 2013 Dayton Dutch Lions season is the club's fourth season of existence, and third consecutive season of playing in the third division of American soccer. The club will be playing in the USL Pro.

Season overview

Competitions

Preseason

USL Pro

Table

U.S. Open Cup

Statistics

Transfers

References 

Dayton Dutch Lions seasons
2013 USL Pro season
Dayton Dutch Lions
Dayton